Matt Mostyn is a retired Irish-Australian rugby player. He earned six caps playing as a wing for the Ireland national rugby union team, including four at the 1999 Rugby World Cup, being eligible through a grandparent from County Tyrone. He played club rugby with the New South Wales Waratahs in Australia, with Bordeaux in France, Newport in Wales and Ireland, finishing his career at Connacht and Galwegians in 2008. 

Mostyn also played sevens for the Ireland national rugby sevens team. He played at the 2001 Rugby World Cup Sevens and also played several legs of the World Rugby Sevens Series.

Mostyn was educated at Saint Ignatius' College, Riverview in Sydney, Australia. He earned a journalism degree in 2005.

References

Living people
1974 births
Irish rugby union players
Australian rugby union players
Ireland international rugby union players
Galwegians RFC players
Connacht Rugby players
Australian people of Northern Ireland descent
Citizens of Ireland through descent
Rugby union players from Sydney
Ireland international rugby sevens players
Australian expatriate sportspeople in France
Australian expatriate rugby union players
Expatriate rugby union players in France
New South Wales Waratahs players
Newport RFC players
CA Bordeaux-Bègles Gironde players
Expatriate rugby union players in Wales
Australian expatriate sportspeople in Wales
Irish expatriate sportspeople in Wales
Irish expatriate rugby union players